Sharon Taylor (born June 5, 1981) is a Canadian actress.

Biography
Sharon Taylor was born and raised in Vancouver, British Columbia, Canada. She received her Bachelor of Fine Arts degree in theatre from Simon Fraser University. She worked extensively in theatre for many years before switching to television and film. She has trained in martial arts for over 15 years and has a second degree black belt in karate and kickboxing. Upon learning that Sharon was a black belt kickboxer, the producers of Stargate: Atlantis decided to write it into her character's actions in the episode "The Prodigal". Taylor is also trained in Jiu-Jitsu and Muay Thai.

Filmography

Film

Television

References

External links
 
 

Living people
Canadian film actresses
Canadian television actresses
Actresses from Vancouver
Canadian female karateka
Canadian female kickboxers
Sportspeople from Vancouver
1981 births
21st-century Canadian women